The Madisson River (in French: rivière Madisson) is a tributary of the west bank of the Chaudière River which flows northward to empty on the south bank of the St. Lawrence River.

The Madisson River flows in the municipalities of Lac-Drolet and Sainte-Cécile-de-Whitton, in the Le Granit Regional County Municipality, in the administrative region of Estrie, Québec, Canada.

Toponymy 

The Madisson River toponym was formalized on March 6, 1970, at the Commission de toponymie du Québec.

See also 
 List of rivers of Quebec

References 

Rivers of Estrie
Le Granit Regional County Municipality